This is a list of internet service providers (ISPs) operating in Brazil.

ISPs in Brazil

Government
 Plano Nacional de Banda Larga (National Broadband Plan)
 Telebrás

Private
  Claro Americas 
 Embratel
 Claro NET
  Algar Telecom
  Internet Group (iG)
  Oi 
  TIM Brasil 
 Intelig Telecom 
  Universo Online (UOL)
 Telefônica Vivo 
 Terra
 Vivo
 Global Village Telecom (GVT)

Regional
Many smaller ISPs are in operation, serving small and medium cities which otherwise would not be profitable for the larger companies. Often, their service is restricted to small areas. For example, these two companies serve only the state of Paraná:
  Sercomtel
  Copel

See also
 Brazilian Internet phenomenon
 Telecommunications in Brazil

References

 
Internet in Brazil
Internet service providers